Franco Reviglio (born 3 February 1935) is an Italian academic, businessman and socialist politician, who served in various capacities in the public administration of Italy.

Early life and education
Reviglio was born in Turin in 1935. He was also educated in Turin. His undergraduate thesis was about improving efficiency in state-owned companies.

Career
Reviglio worked as a professor of public finance at the University of Turin. He was a member of the Socialist Party and served as the minister of finance from 4 August 1979 to 28 June 1981 in the cabinet led by Prime Minister Francesco Cossiga. After working at the University of Turin for two more years he left his job in 1983 and became the president of the Italian energy firm Ente Nazionale Idrocarburi, which is commonly known as ENI. He was appointed to the post in order to reorganize and improve the firm. He achieved these goals in large degree. In fact, ENI witnessed one of its most successful periods when he led the firm. He supported privatization as a means of reorganizing asset portfolios and investment strategies. Reviglio's tenure at the firm ended in November 1989, and Umberto Colombo succeeded him in the post. 

On 5 June 1990, Reviglio joined as a senior advisor to Wasserstein Perella & Co.'s team in regard to its European operations and held the post until 1992. In 1992, he was appointed budget minister in the cabinet led by Prime Minister Giuliano Amato. His tenure lasted until February 1993, and he was replaced by Beniamino Andreatta as budget minister. Reviglio was appointed finance minister in a cabinet reshuffle on 21 February 1993. He succeeded Giovanni Goria in the post. Reviglio resigned from office on 30 March 1993 due to his alleged involvement in a bribery scandal. He also served as a member of municipal council of Turin and as a senator (1992 – 1994).

After leaving office and politics, Reviglio returned to his teaching post at the University of Turin. He also assumed the role of senior advisor to Lehman Brothers from 2002 to 2007. He is the former president and CEO of Azienda Energetica Metropolitana Torino SpA (Turin Energy Company; 2000 – 2006) as well as the president of NNOICOM, TLC company. He is the emeritus professor at the University of Turin.

References

External links

20th-century Italian businesspeople
21st-century Italian businesspeople
1935 births
Businesspeople from Turin
Eni
Finance ministers of Italy
Italian Socialist Party politicians
Leaders of organizations
Living people
Politicians from Turin
Senators of Legislature XI of Italy
Turin communal councillors
Academic staff of the University of Turin